Arjan Vermeulen (born March 19, 1969) is a Dutch former football defender.

Honours

Club
OGC Nice
 Coupe de France: 1997

References

 Stats

1969 births
Living people
People from Culemborg
Dutch footballers
SBV Vitesse players
OGC Nice players
Ligue 1 players
Ligue 2 players
MVV Maastricht players
Heracles Almelo players
Eredivisie players
Eerste Divisie players
Dutch expatriate footballers
Expatriate footballers in France
Association football defenders
Footballers from Gelderland
Dutch expatriate sportspeople in France